New York New York is a 2016 Chinese-Hong Kong romantic drama film directed by Luo Dong. It was released in China by Huayi Brothers and China Film Group on April 15, 2016.

Plot
The ill-fated lovers are Lu Tu (Ethan Juan), the bell captain at a grand hotel, and Juan (Du Juan), whose beauty regularly opens doors — most often to the bedrooms of wealthy older men. When a Shanghai-born Chinese American nicknamed Mr. Money arrives to recruit workers for a new hotel in Manhattan, Juan is ready to go. But Lu Tu, who hates his father for abandoning the family, doesn't want to be the kind of guy who runs away. He must choose between home and love, ultimately making a catastrophic decision.

Cast
Ethan Juan
Du Juan
Michael Miu
Cecilia Yip
Peter Greene
Yuan Wenkang
Huang Ling
Shi An
Shao Wen
Yang Xuwen
Ma Ge
MC Jin

Reception
The film has grossed  in China.

References

External links

Chinese romantic drama films
Hong Kong romantic drama films
2016 romantic drama films
Huayi Brothers films
China Film Group Corporation films
2010s Hong Kong films